The flora of the Little Picacho Wilderness located in southeastern Imperial County, Southern California. It is within the Colorado Desert subregion, of the Sonoran Desert ecoregion

The wilderness area protects a region of the southeastern Chocolate Mountains.

Complete list of flora: Genus-species-(binomials)

Acacia greggii
Amsinckia menziesii var. intermedia
Asclepias subulata
Bebbia juncea
Cercidium floridum
Chaenactis fremontii
Chorizanthe rigida
Cryptantha angustifolia
Dalea albiflora
Encelia farinosa
"ReDir" Eriogonum ssp.
Desert trumpet
"ReDir" Euphorbia albomarginata
Fagonia laevis
Ferocactus wislizeni
"ReDir" Fouquieria splendens (Ocotillo)
Geraea canescens
Hibiscus denudatus
Hyptis emoryi
Krameria grayi
Larrea tridentata
Lupinus arizonicus
Nicotiana obtusifolia
Olneya tesota
Opuntia acanthocarpa
(syn: Cylindropuntia acanthocarpa
Opuntia basilaris
Parkinsonia florida — (Blue Paloverde)
Peucephyllum schottii
Phacelia spp. — (Scorpionweed)
Phacelia crenulata subsp.
Prosopis ssp. — (Mesquite)
Psyllium ssp.
Psorothamnus spinosus
Sphaeralcea ambigua

Perennials

Perennials: Common name

Beavertail Cactus
Bebbia—Chuckwalla's Delight
Brittlebush
Buckhorn Cholla
Catclaw Acacia
Creosote bush
Desert fir
Desert Globemallow
Desert Ironwood
Desert Lavender
Fishhook Barrel Cactus
Mesquite — (Prosopis ssp.)
Rush Milkweed
Desert Milkweed, Leafless Milkweed
Ocotillo
Blue Palo Verde
Rock Hibiscus
Smoketree (Psorothamnus)
Smokethorn'
White Ratany

Perennials: Genus-species-(binomials)

Acacia greggii
Asclepias subulata
Bebbia juncea
Cercidium floridum
Encelia farinosa
Ferocactus wislizeni
"ReDir" Fouquieria splendens
Hibiscus denudatus
Hyptis emoryi
Krameria grayi
Larrea tridentata
Olneya tesota
Opuntia acanthocarpa
(syn: Cylindropuntia acanthocarpa
Opuntia basilaris
Peucephyllum schottii
Prosopis ssp. — (Mesquite)
Psorothamnus spinosus
Sphaeralcea ambigua

Trees, perennials: Common name

Catclaw Acacia
Desert Ironwood
Blue Palo Verde
Smoketree (Psorothamnus)
Smokethorn

Trees, perennials: Genus-species-(binomials)

Acacia greggii
Cercidium floridum
Olneya tesota
Parkinsonia florida
Psorothamnus spinosus

Annuals

Common name

Arizona Lupine
California Fagonbush
'Chicura
Common Fiddleneck
Desert Sunflower
Desert Tobacco
Desert trumpet
Fremont's pincushion
Narrow-leaved Popcorn Flower
Plantago — (Psyllium ssp.)
Rattlesnake Weed
Rigid Spiny Herb
Scorpionweed — (Phacelia spp.)
Notch-leaved Phacelia
Scruffy Prairie Clover
White-bract Stick Leaf
White-bract Blazing Star

Genus-species

Amsinckia menziesii var. intermedia
Chaenactis fremontii
Chorizanthe rigida
Cryptantha angustifolia
Dalea albiflora
"ReDir" Eriogonum ssp.
Eriogonum inflatum — (Desert trumpet)
"ReDir" Euphorbia albomarginata
Fagonia laevis
Geraea canescens
Lupinus arizonicus
Mentzelia involucrata
Nicotiana obtusifolia
Phacelia spp. — (Scorpionweed)
Phacelia crenulata subsp.
Psyllium ssp.

See also
List of southern LCRV flora by region

References

Creosote bush and Bursage, Lower Colorado River Valley-(with photo).
Turner, Bowers, & Burgess. Sonoran Desert Plants; an Ecological Atlas, Raymond M. Turner, Janice E. Bowers, Tony L. Burgess, c 1995, Univ. of Arizona Press, Tucson. 504 pages.

External links

BLM: Little Picacho Peak Wilderness—(Ocotillo at foothills); BLM photo gallery — Ocotillo, on mountains).
Winter 2005-2006: — Trip 1: Indian Pass Wilderness, Little Picacho, and Cargo Muchacho Mountains — with Desert Ironwood (Oleneya tesota) & Blue Paloverde (Parkinsonia florida) images.
Picacho SRA: Beavertail Cactus
Colorado Desert Landforms: Picacho Mountains; UCSB: "Colorado Desert, Picacho Mountains" — Brittlebush next to Ocotillos''.

.

Lists of flora of California
Natural history of the Colorado Desert
Natural history of Imperial County, California
Natural history of the Lower Colorado River Valley